Cros may refer to:

Comunes in France

 Cros, Gard, in the Gard department
 Cros, Puy-de-Dôme, in the Puy-de-Dôme department
 Cros-de-Géorand, in the Ardèche department
 Cros-de-Montvert, in the Cantal department
 Cros-de-Ronesque, in the Cantal department
 Cros-de-Cagnes, part of Cagnes-sur-Mer in the Alpes-Maritimes department

Surname
 Antoine-Hippolyte Cros (1833–1903), French surgeon and pretender to the throne of the Kingdom of Araucanía and Patagonia
 Charles Cros (1842–1888), French poet and inventor
 Laure-Therese Cros (1856–1912), pretender to the throne of Kingdom of Araucanía and Patagonia
 Pierrick Cros (footballer, born 1991), French footballer
 Pierrick Cros (footballer, born 1992), French footballer

Other
 CROS hearing aid, a type of hearing aid
 Capacitor Read-Only Storage, used to store microcode on the IBM System/360 Model 50

See also
 CRO (disambiguation)